Doe, DoE, or DOE may refer to:

Organisations
 Dank of England
 Party for Democracy and Development through Unity (Partij voor Democratie en Ontwikkeling in Eenheid), a political party in Suriname

Government departments
 Department of Education
 Department of Energy
 Department of the Environment
 Roads Service of Northern Ireland; see Department for Infrastructure

Law
 Doctrine of equivalents, in patent law
 Date of effect, the date an event comes into effect, used in contracts
 Date of execution, the date a death penalty is intended to be carried out

Arts and entertainment
 Doe (band), a band from London, UK
 "Doe", a song by the Breeders from their 1990 debut album Pod
 Defying Ocean's End, a 2004 book and global agenda for action in marine conservation

Science, technology, and mathematics
 Doe, an adult female in some animal species; See List of animal names
 Design of experiments, a statistical approach to experimental design
 Diagnosis of exclusion, in medicine
 Diagram of effects, a tool for reasoning about nonlinear systems
 Diffractive optical element; See Multifocal diffractive lens
 Distributed Objects Everywhere, a distributed computing project by Sun Microsystems
 Dyspnea on exertion
 Dodecahedron, a regular polyhedron

People
 Doe (surname)
 Doe people, a people of coastal Tanzania

Other uses
 Doe language, spoken by the Doe people
 Doe River, a river in Tennessee, US
 Deduction or earning, in payroll
 Depending on experience, in employment hiring
 Duke of Edinburgh (DoE), a dukedom associated with Edinburgh, UK

See also
 Do (disambiguation)
 Doh (disambiguation)
 Doo (disambiguation)
 Dough, a thick, malleable, sometimes elastic, paste
 The Duke of Edinburgh's Award (DofE)